Bolsover South is a former railway station in Carr Vale, Bolsover, Derbyshire, England.

History
The station was opened by the LD&ECR in March 1897 as plain "Bolsover". It was closed to all traffic by British Railways in December 1951, primarily due to the prohibitive cost of repairing and maintaining Bolsover Tunnel. Track lifting started immediately after closure and was completed within weeks, though the station building survived as an increasingly vandalised eyesore for some years. The photograph opposite shows the characteristic Station Master's house in 1963, the station itself was behind the bush on the extreme right of the photo. Also behind the photo to the left was a railway-served jam factory.

The station was built in Carr Vale and was one of only two places on the LD&ECR where a level crossing was necessary, the other being Skellingthorpe. To the west was Doe Lea Viaduct and to the east was a  limestone ridge through which it was necessary to drive the notorious Bolsover Tunnel. To the east of this was the next station at Scarcliffe.

The station architecture was in the company's characteristic modular style with much glazing as were, for example, Arkwright Town, Edwinstowe and Ollerton.

1912 was a notable year for Bolsover South, with flash floods on 27 July and 26 August.

References

Sources

Further reading

External links
The station on a post war O.S. map in npe Maps
The station on a navigable Edwardian 6" OS map, with overlays  in National Library of Scotland
The station and line in Rail Maps Online
The station and lots besides inYahoo
Bolsover railway structures in Signalboxes
The station on line CLN1 in Railway Codes

Disused railway stations in Derbyshire
Former Lancashire, Derbyshire and East Coast Railway stations
Railway stations in Great Britain opened in 1897
Railway stations in Great Britain closed in 1951
Bolsover